Georgia Wood Pangborn (1872–1955) was an American writer of novels and short stories. She is known as a writer of horror and the macabre. She was the mother of Edgar Pangborn and Mary Pangburn.

Life 
Georgia Wood was born in Malone, New York in 1872. She graduated from Smith College and married Harry Levi Pangborn in 1894. Pangborn lived for a time on Wall Street in Manhattan, New York, and was a member of the New York literary establishment. Her work was published in Scribner's Magazine, Harper's Monthly, and Colliers, among others. She died in Poughkeepsie, New York in 1955.

Selected works

Short stories 
 "The Gray Collie" (1903)
 "Cara" (1914)
 "The Rescue" (1912)
 "The Substitute" (1914)
 "The Intruder" (1907)

Collected works 
 The Wind at Midnight (1999)

References

External links 

 Georgia Wood Pangborn on Harper's Online Archive

1872 births
1955 deaths
19th-century American novelists
20th-century American novelists
American horror novelists
American women novelists
20th-century American women writers
Smith College alumni
19th-century American women writers
People from Malone, New York